Billio is a commune in the Morbihan department of Brittany in northwestern France.

Population
Inhabitants of Billio are called Billiotais in French.

See also
Communes of the Morbihan department

References
 Mayors of Morbihan Association 

Communes of Morbihan